Daniel Fernandes Jaló  (born 17 May 1994), is a Guinea-Bissauan professional footballer who plays as a forward. He is also known by his nickname, Kabi.

External links

1994 births
Living people
Bissau-Guinean footballers
Bissau-Guinean expatriate footballers
AD Oliveirense players
FC Zimbru Chișinău players
Real S.C. players
S.R. Almancilense players
C.D. Trofense players
Campeonato de Portugal (league) players
Expatriate footballers in Portugal
Expatriate footballers in Moldova
Expatriate footballers in Germany
Expatriate footballers in Cyprus
Bissau-Guinean expatriate sportspeople in Portugal
Bissau-Guinean expatriate sportspeople in Moldova
Bissau-Guinean expatriate sportspeople in Germany
Bissau-Guinean expatriate sportspeople in Cyprus

Association football forwards
AD Oeiras players